This is a list of magazines writing about comics. The primary focus of the magazines in this list is or was writing about comics for at least part of their run.

See also 
 Anime
 Comics
 Manga
 List of manga magazines

References

Comics